Olga Romanova may refer to:

Grand Duchess Olga Nikolaevna of Russia (1895–1918), daughter of Nicholas II of Russia
Grand Duchess Olga Alexandrovna of Russia (1882–1960), daughter of Alexander III of Russia
Olga Romanova (athlete) (born 1980), Russian long-distance runner
Olga "Dark Princess" Romanova, former lead singer of the Gothic metal band Dark Princess
Victim in the Moscow theater hostage crisis
Olga Romanova (journalist), television and newspaper journalist, opposition activist